Brandon Bell is a Grammy Award winning record engineer, mix engineer and producer based in Nashville, TN. His credits include Alan Jackson, Sarah Jarosz, Steep Canyon Rangers, Zac Brown Band, The Highwomen, Foo Fighters, Brandy Clark, Parker McCollum, Brandi Carlile, Earl Scruggs, Alison Krauss and Union Station, Dierks Bentley, Miranda Lambert and Blackberry Smoke.

Bell graduated from Middle Tennessee State University in 2004. In 2014, he was hired as the Studio Director and Chief Engineer at Southern Ground Nashville, owned by recording artist, Zac Brown.

He has been featured as a special guest on music industry podcasts including: Recording Studio Rock Stars and Surviving The Music Industry with Brandon Harrington.

Bell also sits on the committee of the Audio Engineering Society.

Education 
Bell completed high school at Heber Springs High School in Heber Springs, AR and graduated with a Bachelor of Science degree in Recording Industry at Middle Tennessee State University.

Selected Discography

Awards 
Bell has received two nominations for Grammy Award for Best Engineered Album, Non-Classical with Gary Paczosa. The first in 2006 for Alan Jackson's Like Red on a Rose (which is also Gold Certified by RIAA) and the second in 2011 for Sarah Jarosz's Follow Me Down.

He won the Grammy Award for Best Bluegrass Album in 2013 for his work on Steep Canyon Rangers’ album Nobody Knows You.

Bell engineered Brandi Carlile's lead single Right on Time, from the Album In These Silent Days. The single received Grammy nominations for Record of the Year, Song of the Year, and Best Pop Solo Performance in 2022.

He was nominated for Audio Engineer of The Year for the 2022 ACM Awards. 

Bell also engineered The Marfa Tapes which was nominated for Best Country Album  at the 64th Annual Grammy Awards.

In 2023, Bell won the Grammy Award for Best Americana Album for his work as an engineer on Brandi Carlile's album  In These Silent Days. The album also received the Grammy nomination for Album of the Year. Carlile's single Broken Horses won Best Rock Performance and Best Rock Song at the 65th Annual Grammy Awards. You and Me on the Rock, was nominated for Record of the Year, Best Americana Performance, and Best American Roots Song.

References 

Audio engineers
Grammy Award winners
People from Heber Springs, Arkansas
Year of birth missing (living people)
Living people